The following is a list of principals of Phillips Exeter Academy, an independent preparatory school in Exeter, New Hampshire, founded in 1781 by John Phillips. There have, since 1783, been 16 principals in total, including one interim principal. From the founding of the academy to 1808, the head of school was called preceptor before it was changed to principal.

Principals

References 

Lists of American people by school affiliation
Lists of people by educational affiliation in New Hampshire
Exeter, New Hampshire
Phillips Exeter Academy faculty